William Joseph Daly ( 7 November 1892 – 26 September 1980) was an Australian rules footballer who played with Melbourne and South Melbourne in the Victorian Football League (VFL).

Daly was recruited from Wonthaggi, but came from Beverley originally. He played just two games for Melbourne in the 1913 VFL season and didn't make any more league appearances until 1915, when he joined South Melbourne.

After the club sat out of league football in 1916 due to the war, Daly played all 16 games for South Melbourne in 1917. He again didn't miss a single game in 1918 and was on a half back flank in the 1918 VFL Grand Final winning side.

He subsequently played with Footscray in the Victorian Football Association (VFA).

References

1892 births
Australian rules footballers from Victoria (Australia)
Melbourne Football Club players
Sydney Swans players
Sydney Swans Premiership players
Footscray Football Club (VFA) players
1980 deaths
One-time VFL/AFL Premiership players